The 1901 USC Methodists football team was an American football team that represented the University of Southern California (USC) as an independent during the 1901 college football season.

The team lost its only intercollegiate game of the year to Pomona College.  The team also played a game against an All-Southern California all-star team, losing by a 45 to 0 score.

Schedule

References

USC
USC Trojans football seasons
College football winless seasons
USC Methodists football
USC Methodists football